Chasetown Football Club is an English football club based in the Chasetown area of Burntwood, Staffordshire.

Chasetown gained national recognition in November 2005 when the BBC televised the club's FA Cup first round home tie with Oldham Athletic, in which the team held their Football League opponents to a 1–1 draw.  They went on to finish the 2005–06 season as Midland Alliance champions and thereby gain promotion to the Southern League.  In the 2007–08 F.A Cup they made the third round for the first time in their history after holding Port Vale to a 1–1 draw and winning the replay 1–0. They lost the third round match 3–1 to eventual finalists Cardiff City. In doing so, they became the lowest ever ranked club to reach as far as the third round proper of the FA Cup.

History

The club was formed in 1954 as Chase Terrace Old Scholars Youth Club and initially played in the Cannock Youth League.  At the start of the 1958–59 season the club joined the Lichfield and District League, where the club spent three seasons, finishing as runners-up in the league and Challenge Cup.

For the 1961–62 season the club stepped up to the Staffordshire County League before moving to the West Midlands (Regional) League Division One and adopting the new name of Chasetown F.C. in 1972.

In eleven seasons in this division Chasetown never finished outside the top four, winning the championship in 1977–78, but were prevented from gaining promotion because they were playing on a park pitch at Burntwood Recreation Centre.  In 1983 the club moved to a new ground, The Scholars Ground, and gained entry to the Premier Division.  Although the Scholars initially struggled to finish outside the lower reaches of the table, the team won their first trophy in 1989–90, defeating Oldbury United to win the League Cup, soon followed by winning the Walsall Senior Cup.  Chasetown beat Blakenall at the Bescot Stadium and retained the trophy in 1992–93, beating Pelsall Villa 3–1.

In the early 1990s, Chasetown won the West Midlands League Cup twice and finishing as runners-up in the twice.  The Scholars were among the founder members of the newly formed Midland Football Alliance in 1994 but failed to make an impression in the early seasons.

In 2000–01 the club in a transitional period after the departure of long-serving manager Mervyn Rowe, and only escaped relegation due to the fact that no clubs were promoted from the lower division.  Charlie Blakemore returned to the club in partnership with Michael Rowe, son of previous manager Mervyn, and the club's fortunes began to turn around, with two top-half finishes.  In Blakemore's first full season in complete control of the first team, 2004–05, Chasetown won the Walsall Senior Cup for the third time and finished second to Rushall Olympic in the Midland Alliance.

Chasetown were placed the national spotlight in November 2005 when the club reached the first round of the FA Cup for the first time in their history.  After defeating Blyth Spartans the team took on Oldham Athletic in a match broadcast live on television. A peak audience of 3.2 million people watched the game live. In front of 1,997 supporters, Chasetown took the lead through Nicky Harrison, only for veteran David Eyres to level the scores and send the game into a replay.  Chasetown took 2,436 supporters to the replay but succumbed to a 0–4 defeat.  As a result of this cup run the club was able to secure a shirt sponsorship deal with Richard Branson's Virgin Holidays for the 2006–07 season.  Meanwhile, in the league, Chasetown rallied from 14th place at Christmas, 20 points behind leaders Malvern Town, to win the Midland Alliance championship and gain promotion to the Southern League Division One Midlands.

In 2007–08, Chasetown beat Team Bath 2–0 to reach the second round proper of the FA Cup for the first time in their history. This set up an away tie against Staffordshire rivals Port Vale, which they drew 1–1 before winning the replay 1–0 to set up a Third Round match at home to Championship side Cardiff City and making Chasetown the lowest ranked club ever to make the third round of the competition. While Chasetown lost the third round match to Cardiff City 3–1, they went ahead because of a Kevin McNaughton own goal, and held the lead until just before half-time.

As a result of playing the F.A Cup tie in 2008, Cardiff City invited Chasetown to be the first official opponent at the Cardiff City Stadium, played on Friday 10 July, resulting in a 4–0 win for the Welsh side.

On 1 May 2010, Chasetown won the Northern Premier League Division One South play-offs, beating Glapwell 1–0 in front of a crowd of 1,265 to gain promotion to level 7 of the English football league system for the first time in their history.

On 16 November 2010 Chasetown won a £10,000 Makeover Competition from the Northern Premier League, winning a £10,000 voucher from Travis Perkins builders' merchants to improve facilities at the Scholars Ground.  On 14 December 2010 Chasetown beat Kettering Town 2–1 in an FA Trophy replay, another cup upset as two divisions separated the sides and Kettering were at home.  On 15 January 2011 Chasetown produced another upset by defeating Conference National side Grimsby Town to reach the last sixteen of the competition. In the last sixteen they defeated Eastleigh of Conference South to gain a place in the quarter finals. 

In the 2012–13 season they finished 5th to secure the last play-off spot on goal difference and went on to beat Coalville Town in the semi-finals of the 8th tier play-offs to go to the final where they lost to Stamford.  In the 2017–18 season they again secured a play-off spot and went on to play Bedworth United in the semi-finals where they lost 2-1. In the 2021–22 season, they finished 4th and drew third-placed Halesowen Town in the semi finals of the playoffs. They won 1-0  with an 89th minute goal to reach the final where they played Belper Town but lost the game 1-0.

Crest
Chasetown's crest features a deer, in reference to nearby Cannock Chase, and a Stafford Knot.

Ground and supporters

The Scholars Ground has been Chasetown's home since 1983.  The ten highest official attendances recorded at the ground for competitive fixtures are as follows:

There are 4 sides at The Scholars ground, A seated with a clubhouse and wooden seats which is also the oldest of them. There is also turnstiles on this side, Another seated stand behind the goal where in November 2022 a new 300 seated stand was put in place through the clubs twenty20 lottery funds of £13,000, 5 rows of metal terracing for away fans in league and cup games after a final end running across the far side of the pitch where the dugouts are.

Players

Curtis Pond
Jordan Evans
Alex Melbourne
Mitch Clarke
Tom Unwin
Kris Taylor
Ryan Wynter
Mitch Botfield
Zack Foster
Oli Hayward
Jack Langston
Ben Lund
Jayden Campbell
Danny O'Callaghan
John Letford
Ryan Boothe
Aaron Ashford
Liam Kirton

Team management

Mark Swann - Manager
Jamie Hawkins - Assistant Manager 
Chris Slater - Coach
John Birt - Goalkeeping coach
Liam Brown -  Head Sports Therapist
Kris Taylor - Player/Coach
Dave Harrison - Kit Manager

Honours and records

West Midlands (Regional) League Division One
Champions: 1978
West Midlands (Regional) League Premier Division Cup
Winners: 1990, 1991
Walsall Senior Cup
Winners: 1991, 1993, 2005, 2014
Midland Football Alliance
Champions: 2005
Runners-up: 2004
Joe McGorian Cup  (Midland Football Alliance Winners vs League Cup Winners)
Winners: 2006
Northern Premier League Division One South
Runners-up & Playoff Winners: 2010

National cup record
Best FA Cup performance : Third Round Proper – 2007/08
Best FA Trophy performance : Fourth round proper – 2010/2011
Best FA Vase performance : Fifth Round Proper – 1999/2000

Team records
(1972–73 onwards)
Most league goals (season) : 94 (West Mids Div 1 ; 1975/76)
Most points scored :
 Two points for a win : 64 (West Mids Div 1, 40 Games, 1975/76)
 Three points for a win : 94 (Midland Alliance, 42 Games, 2005/06)

Individual records
Most goals scored (career) : Tony Dixon – 197 goals (1987–94, 1995–98)
Most goals scored (season) : Mick Ward – 39 goals (1987–88)
Most goals scored (match) : Keith Birch – 11 versus Lichfield Laundry (21–1)
Highest transfer fee received : "undisclosed" amounts for Chris Slater and Kyle Perry (both Port Vale)
Karl Edwards once scored in 10 consecutive league games – a club record
Danny Smith was Chasetown's youngest modern day goalscorer aged 17 years and 143 days
Chasetown became the first club from the eighth tier of the English football pyramid to reach the 3rd Round of the FA Cup in the 2007–08 season followed by Marine vs Tottenham Hotspur in 2020.

References

External links

 Chasetown FC Official Site
 Chasetown FC News at nonleaguenews.co.uk
 BBC: Motivation – Chasetown style. Hear the Chasetown manager’s "Churchillian" dressing room team talk.

 
Football clubs in Staffordshire
Southern Football League clubs
Association football clubs established in 1954
1954 establishments in England
Football clubs in England
Staffordshire County League
Northern Premier League clubs